A portico is a porch leading to the entrance of a building, or extended as a colonnade, with a roof structure over a walkway, supported by columns or enclosed by walls. This idea was widely used in ancient Greece and has influenced many cultures, including most Western cultures.

Porticos are sometimes topped with pediments. 
Palladio was a pioneer of using temple-fronts for secular buildings. In the UK, the temple-front applied to The Vyne, Hampshire, was the first portico applied to an English country house.

A pronaos ( or ) is the inner area of the portico of a Greek or Roman temple, situated between the portico's colonnade or walls and the entrance to the cella, or shrine. Roman temples commonly had an open pronaos, usually with only columns and no walls, and the pronaos could be as long as the cella. The word pronaos is Greek for "before a temple". In Latin, a pronaos is also referred to as an anticum or prodomus.

Types 
The different variants of porticos are named by the number of columns they have. The "style" suffix comes from the Greek , "column".

Tetrastyle 

The tetrastyle has four columns; it was commonly employed by the Greeks and the Etruscans for small structures such as public buildings and amphiprostyles.

The Romans favoured the four columned portico for their pseudoperipteral temples like the Temple of Portunus, and for amphiprostyle temples such as the Temple of Venus and Roma, and for the prostyle entrance porticos of large public buildings like the Basilica of Maxentius and Constantine. Roman provincial capitals also manifested tetrastyle construction, such as the Capitoline Temple in Volubilis.

The North Portico of the White House is perhaps the most notable four-columned portico in the United States.

Hexastyle 
Hexastyle buildings had six columns and were the standard façade in canonical Greek Doric architecture between the archaic period 600–550 BCE up to the Age of Pericles 450–430 BCE.

Greek hexastyle 

Some well-known examples of classical Doric hexastyle Greek temples:

 The group at Paestum comprising the Temple of Hera (c. 550 BCE), the Temple of Apollo (c. 450 BCE), the first Temple of Athena ("Basilica") (c. 500 BCE) and the second Temple of Hera (460–440 BCE)
 The Temple of Aphaea at Aegina c. 495 BCE
 Temple E at Selinus (465–450 BCE) dedicated to Hera
 The Temple of Zeus at Olympia, now a ruin
 Temple F or the so-called "Temple of Concord" at Agrigentum (c. 430 BCE), one of the best-preserved classical Greek temples, retaining almost all of its peristyle and entablature
 The "unfinished temple" at Segesta (c. 430 BCE)
 The Temple of Hephaestus below the Acropolis at Athens, long known as the "Theseum" (449–444 BCE), also one of the most intact Greek temples surviving from antiquity
 The Temple of Poseidon on Cape Sunium (c. 449 BCE)

Hexastyle was also applied to Ionic temples, such as the prostyle porch of the sanctuary of Athena on the Erechtheum, at the Acropolis of Athens.

Roman hexastyle 
With the colonization by the Greeks of Southern Italy, hexastyle was adopted by the Etruscans and subsequently acquired by the ancient Romans. Roman taste favoured narrow pseudoperipteral and amphiprostyle buildings with tall columns, raised on podiums for the added pomp and grandeur conferred by considerable height. The Maison Carrée at Nîmes, France, is the best-preserved Roman hexastyle temple surviving from antiquity.

Octastyle 

Octastyle buildings had eight columns; they were considerably rarer than the hexastyle ones in the classical Greek architectural canon. The best-known octastyle buildings surviving from antiquity are the Parthenon in Athens, built during the Age of Pericles (450–430 BCE), and the Pantheon in Rome (125 CE). The destroyed Temple of Divus Augustus in Rome, the centre of the Augustan cult, is shown on Roman coins of the 2nd century CE as having been built in octastyle.

Decastyle 
The decastyle has ten columns; as in the temple of Apollo Didymaeus at Miletus, and the portico of University College London.

The only known Roman decastyle portico is on the Temple of Venus and Roma, built by Hadrian in about 130 CE.

Gallery

See also

Citations

General and cited references

External links 

Architectural elements
Columns and entablature